The Ribatejo is the most central of the traditional provinces of Portugal, with no coastline or border with Spain. The region is crossed by the Tagus river (Ribatejo translates to "upper Tagus", or more precisely, "up the Tagus" relative to Lisbon at its mouth). The region contains some of the nation's richest agricultural land, and it produces most of the animals used in the Portuguese style of bullfighting.

Ribatejo Province was formally created in 1936. It contained the municipalities of Abrantes, Alcanena, Almeirim, Alpiarça, Azambuja, Benavente, Cartaxo, Chamusca, Constância, Coruche, Entroncamento, Ferreira do Zêzere, Golegã, Rio Maior, Salvaterra de Magos, Santarém, Sardoal, Tomar, Torres Novas, Vila Franca de Xira and Vila Nova da Barquinha. The largest towns were Santarém and Tomar.

In 1976 the Ribatejo Province was dissolved. Most of the area belongs to the Santarém District.

For EU statistical purposes, it was divided between the Lezíria do Tejo, Médio Tejo, Lisbon metropolitan area and Alto Alentejo subregions (NUTS III), belonging to the Centro, Lisbon and Alentejo EU statistical regions (NUTS II).

Municipalities
Lisboa District: Arruda dos Vinhos, Azambuja and Vila Franca de Xira municipalities
Santarém District: Abrantes, Alcanena, Almeirim, Alpiarça, Benavente, Cartaxo, Chamusca, Constância, Coruche, Ferreira do Zêzere, Golegã, Rio Maior, Salvaterra de Magos, Santarém, Sardoal, Tomar, Torres Novas and Vila Nova da Barquinha municipalities

See also
Lezíria do Tejo
Tejo VR, a wine region formerly known as Ribatejo VR
Rotas de Portugal - Ribatejo
O melhor do Ribatejo
Comunidade Intermunicipal da Lezíria do Tejo
Distrito de Santarém

References

Provinces of Portugal (1936–1976)